Jatt may refer to:
 Jat people, a social group of the Indian subcontinent
 Jatt, Israel, a local council

See also 
 
 Jat (disambiguation)